DIS3 mitotic control homolog (S. cerevisiae)-like 2 is a protein in humans that is encoded by the DIS3L2 gene. The protein encoded by this gene is similar in sequence to 3'/5' exonucleolytic subunits of the RNA exosome. The exosome is a large multimeric ribonucleotide complex responsible for degrading various RNA substrates. Several transcript variants, some protein-coding and some not, have been found for this gene. [provided by RefSeq, Mar 2012].

Clinical significance 
Mutations in DIS3L2 cause Perlman syndrome.

References

Further reading 

Genes on human chromosome 2